Aly Abdel Aziz (born 1 October 1947) is an Egyptian former professional squash player. Aziz was born in Alexandria and turned professional in 1957. He won the 1973 Egyptian Open and represented Egypt in the 1981 Men's World Team Squash Championships.

References

External links
 

Egyptian male squash players
1947 births
Living people
Sportspeople from Alexandria
20th-century Egyptian people